Leonid Georgiyevich Sagayduk (1929–1998) was a Soviet swimmer and swimming coach. He competed at the 1952 Summer Olympics in the 100 m backstroke, but failed to reach the final. He won four national backstroke titles in 1951, 1956, 1957 and 1959.

After retiring from competitions, between 1963 and 1991 he worked as a swimming coach and a teacher at the Lesgaft Institute of Physical Education in Saint Petersburg. During the last 20 years he was the head coach of Saint Petersburg team.

References

1929 births
1998 deaths
Soviet male swimmers
Male backstroke swimmers
Olympic swimmers of the Soviet Union
Swimmers at the 1952 Summer Olympics